Joy may refer to:

Albert Bruce-Joy (1842–1924), Irish sculptor
 Alfred Harrison Joy (1882–1973), American astronomer 
Alice Joy, American singer in vaudeville and on radio
Anya Taylor-Joy (born 1996), American-born Argentine-British actress
 Benny Joy (1935–1988), American rockabilly musician
Bernard Joy (1911–1984), English footballer and journalist
Bill Joy (born 1954), American computer scientist
Billy Joy (1863–1947), English footballer
 Brian Joy (1951–), English footballer
C. Turner Joy (1895–1956), American admiral
 Charles A. Joy (1823–1891), American chemist
 Charles Frederick Joy (1849–1921), U.S. Representative from Missouri 
Christian Joy (born 1973), American fashion designer
Dick Joy (1915-1991) American announcer on radio and television
Elijah Joy (born 1983), American vegan celebrity chef
George William Joy (1844–1925), Irish painter
Gloria Joy (1910–1970), American actress
Greg Joy (born 1956), Canadian high jumper
Hélène_Joy, Australian-born Canadian actress
Henry Bourne Joy (1864–1936), American industrialist
Ian Joy (born 1981), American soccer player
John Cantiloe Joy (1806–1866) British marine painter, brother of William Joy
 Joseph Francis Joy (1883–1957), American inventor and founder of Joy Mining Machinery 
Leatrice Joy (1893–1985), American actress
Lina Joy (born 1964), Malay convert from Islam to Christianity
Lisa Joy (born 1977), American screenwriter, director, producer, and attorney
Martha Joy (born 1990), Canadian singer
Mary Eliza Haweis, née Joy (1848–1898), British author, illustrator and painter
Megan Joy (born 1985), American singer-songwriter and actress
Melanie Joy (born 1966), American social psychologist and author
Mike Joy (born 1949), American TV sports announcer
Mike Joy (born 1959), New Zealand ecologist and academic
Norman H. Joy (1874–1953), British coleopterist
Petra Joy (born 1964), German film director
Rick Joy (born 1958), American architect
Robert Joy (born 1951), Canadian actor
Tonie Joy, American musician
William Joy, (fl. 1329 – 1348) English master mason
William Joy (1803–1867), British marine painter, brother of John Cantiloe Joy